Alin Liviu Ignea (born 28 April 1989) is a Romanian professional footballer who plays as a midfielder for SSU Politehnica Timișoara.

Honours
FC Botoșani
Liga II: 2012–2013

References

External links
 
 

1989 births
Living people
Sportspeople from Timișoara
Romanian footballers
FC UTA Arad players
CS Pandurii Târgu Jiu players
FC Botoșani players
CS Minaur Baia Mare (football) players
ACS Poli Timișoara players
SSU Politehnica Timișoara players
Liga I players
Liga II players
Association football midfielders